John William Gaudin (1876 – 10 December 1947) was a professional golfer from Jersey. His most successful period was in the early 1920s when he was in his late-40s. Gaudin had four brothers who were also professional golfers, his older brother Willie and younger brothers Phil, Ernest and Herbert.

Golf career
Gaudin was particularly successful from 1920 to 1925. He had a number of good finishes in the Open Championship including being tied for 6th place in 1925. He was runner-up in the 1921 News of the World Match Play. He met Bert Seymour in the 36-hole final. Gaudin missed a three-foot putt at the last and the match went to extra holes. Seymour missed short putts at the second and third extra holes and eventually won the match with another short putt at the 40th hole. Seymour won £200 for his victory while Gaudin took home £50. Gaudin won the Leeds Cup in 1922 and 1924 and was runner-up in 1924. He was runner-up in the 1923 French Open.

Retirement and death
Gaudin retired from Alwoodley Golf Club, Leeds, in 1946 after 34 years there and died the following year on 10 December 1947.

Professional wins
1922 Leeds Cup
1923 Leeds Cup

Results in major championships

Note: Gaudin only played in The Open Championship.

NT = No tournament
WD = withdrew
CUT = missed the half-way cut
"T" indicates a tie for a place

References

Jersey male golfers
People from Grouville
1876 births
1947 deaths